Group D of the men's football tournament at the 2016 Summer Olympics was played from 4 to 10 August 2016, and included Algeria, Argentina, Honduras and Portugal. The top two teams advanced to the knockout stage.

All times are BRT (UTC−3).

Teams

Standings

Matches

Honduras vs Algeria

Portugal vs Argentina

Honduras vs Portugal

Argentina vs Algeria

Argentina vs Honduras

Algeria vs Portugal

References

External links
Football – Men, Rio2016.com
Men's Olympic Football Tournament, Rio 2016, FIFA.com

Group D